Daruni Maira is a village in the Khyber Pakhtunkhwa province of Pakistan. It is located at 34°3'0N 73°7'0E with an altitude of 759 metres (2493 feet).

References

Villages in Khyber Pakhtunkhwa